Pilskalne Parish may refer to:
 Pilskalne Parish, Ilūkste
 Pilskalne Parish, Nereta

Parish name disambiguation pages